Abdulmalik Timmy Owolabi-Belewu (born 3 July 2002) is an English professional footballer who plays as a defender for Forge FC in the Canadian Premier League

Early life
Born in London, England, Owolabi-Belewu began playing youth football with the Junior Red Spartans. When he was 13, he moved to London, Ontario, Canada with his family. He began playing with Whitecaps London SC, later being invited to try out for the official Vancouver Whitecaps FC Academy, however, due to an injury, he was unable to make the team. In 2018, he joined the Toronto FC Academy. In 2020, he returned to England. In June 2020, he was invited to trial with English club Chelsea, however was unable to attend due to COVID-19 pandemic travel restrictions. He also had interest from  English clubs Crystal Palace and Sunderland, Italian club AS Roma, German club Hertha Berlin, Belgian club Anderlecht, and French club OGC Nice. In 2020, he had been set to join Phoenix Sports F.C. in the English eighth tier Isthmian League, however, before officially signing, Italian club SPAL invited him for a trial.

Club career
In 2020, he signed for Italian Serie B side SPAL. He spent the majority of the time with the U19 squad, making the bench for the first team for two cup matches, but not making an appearance. 

In April 2022, he signed for Canadian Premier League club Forge FC. On 14 May 2022, Owolabi-Belewu debuted for Forge FC during a 1–1 draw with Atlético Ottawa. He scored his first goal on 1 October 2022 against York United.

International career
At international level, he is eligible to represent England through birth, Canada through residency, and Nigeria through his parents.

In 2017, he attended a camp with the Canada U15 national team.

In 2019, he was invited to a camp with the Nigeria U17 team, but was unable to accept the call-up.

In 2020, he committed to representing Nigeria at international level.

Career statistics

References

External links

2002 births
Living people
Association football defenders
Canadian Premier League players
English expatriate footballers
English expatriate sportspeople in Canada
English expatriate sportspeople in Italy
English footballers
English people of Nigerian descent
Expatriate footballers in Italy
Expatriate soccer players in Canada
Footballers from Greater London
Forge FC players
S.P.A.L. players